Aoplus is a genus of insects belonging to the family Ichneumonidae.

The genus was first described by Tischbein in 1874.

The species of this genus are found in Europe and Northern America.

Species:
 Aoplus ruficeps (Gravenhorst, 1829)

References

Ichneumoninae
Ichneumonidae genera